The 2011 Cork Premier Intermediate Football Championship was the sixth staging of the Cork Premier Intermediate Football Championship since its establishment by the Cork County Board in 2006. The draw for the opening round fixtures took place on 11 December 2010. The championship began on 7 May 2011 and ended on 5 November 2011.

Newcestown and Glanmire left the championship after their respective promotion and relegation to different grades. Macroom and Naomh Abán joined the championship. Grenagh were relegated from the championship after being beaten in a playoff by Newmarket.

The final was played on 16 October 2011 at Páirc Uí Chaoimh in Cork, between Newmarket and Clyda Rovers. Newmarket won the final by 3-06 to 1-10 to claim their first championship title in the grade. It was Clyda Rovers' third successive final defeat.

Newmarket's Nicky Flanagan was the championship's top scorer with 1-24.

Team changes

To Championship

Promoted from the Cork Intermediate Football Championship
 Macroom

Relegated from the Cork Senior Football Championship
 Naomh Abán

From Championship

Promoted to the Cork Senior Football Championship
 Newcestown

Relegated to the Cork Intermediate Football Championship
 Glanmire

Results

Round 1

Round 2

Round 3

Relegation playoff

Round 4

Quarter-finals

Semi-finals

Final

Championship statistics

Top scorers

Overall

In a single game

References

External links
2011 Cork PIFC results

Cork Premier Intermediate Football Championship